Talavera la Nueva is an  ("administrative territorial entity below municipality") belonging to the municipality of Talavera de la Reina, Spain.

History
Located 5 km away from the city proper of Talavera de la Reina, it was founded by the Instituto Nacional de Colonización (INC) during the Francoist dictatorship as a planned settlement oriented to cattle farming. It was formally inaugurated on 5 October 1956 by the dictator, although colonizers already dwelled in the settlement since at least 2 or 3 years before the ceremony.

Archeological site
The archeological site of the Roman Villa of El Saucedo is located in the area. A largely intact verraco was found in the former.

References

Talavera de la Reina
Populated places in the Province of Toledo